San Amaro is a municipality in Ourense (province) in the Galicia region of north-west Spain.  Its name refers to Saint Amaro.

References  

Municipalities in the Province of Ourense